Llanelly House (also spelled Llanelli House) is one of the most notable historic properties in Llanelli, Carmarthenshire, Wales—an excellent example of an early-18th-century Georgian town house. It had been described as "the most outstanding domestic building of its early Georgian type to survive in South Wales."

The then Member of Parliament for Carmarthenshire, Sir Thomas Stepney, 5th Baronet, of the Pembrokeshire and Carmarthenshire Stepney family, originally built the house in 1714. John Wesley, the early leader of the Methodist movement, stayed at the house several times during his visits to the town.

The house, located directly opposite the parish church of St Ellyw, was in a poor state of repair; however, the town council purchased it from the local business community with the intention of completely restoring the House for civic and public use.

Restoration

In November 2009 Carmarthenshire Heritage Regeneration Trust (CHRT) secured £6 million funding for the conservation and restoration of the building, with plans to develop a ground-breaking innovative visitor experience with heritage at its core. Extensive research into the history of the house and its original condition was performed focusing on the architecture and design of the building, as well as artefacts and stories of past occupants who left their mark in Llanelli's history. The benefactors of the project are the Heritage Lottery Fund, Welsh European Funding Office (WEFO) and Cadw. The aim is to create a social hub that the entire community can utilise, evoking local and national pride.

Media
The Llanelly House project was effectively started during the 2003 BBC Restoration series, in which the building was an acclaimed finalist, championed by Laurence Llewelyn Bowen. During the series the house reached the final as the winner of the Welsh heat. In June 2006 Llanelly House featured in the TV show Most Haunted Live as part of a three night investigation which also included Parc Howard Museum and Kidwelly Castle.

In February 2011 planners announced that architects Austin-Smith:Lord had been employed to undertake the £6m restoration project, a month after Carmarthenshire County Council had revealed funding was in place.

Archaeology
Although there has been a great amount of historical research undertaken on Llanelly House over the years, comprehensive archaeological investigations did not begin until March 2011. These investigations have revealed that Llanelly House, rather than being exclusively the remains of a significantly well preserved Queen Anne and Georgian gentry house with a colourful history built in 1714, Llanelly House also  has foundations and significant standing remains that date back to both the Elizabethan and Jacobean periods.

The initial archaeological work in 2011, guided by the ongoing restoration programme, focused firstly on a program of standing building recording on the interior of the house following the removal of deteriorated plasterwork from a number of internal elevations. This first phase of on-site work managed to record a number of interesting features within the standing fabric of the exposed internal elevations, especially at ground floor level, including a number of blocked in, enlarged and reduced doorways, windows and fireplaces, that pre-dated the 18th-century house.

Following this initial building inspection and survey work, ground work began in April 2011, with the lifting of existing floorboards for the insertion of new floor supports and services, from four of the ground floor rooms, the former Sir Thomas Stepney's Study, the Great Hall and the two rooms that occupy the south-western range of the house. Finds recovered from the upper most occupation layer of one of these trial pits (The Great Hall) included several large fragments of 17th-century decorative plasterwork, suggesting that parts of the 17th-century house had been demolished and the floor level raised to the present height.

The trial pit in Sir Thomas Stepney's Study however told a very different story from the re-opened trial pits in the former Great Hall and the south-western range. This trial pit revealed that the under-floor material was a single fill deposit characterised by demolition material of small stones, mortar and soil. An interesting feature exposed in this preliminary trial pit was a narrow north to south aligned stone built cross wall, which was partly supporting the present floor joists. The fact that the fill of this trial pit was all one deposit, suggested that the floor level in this room had been raised only once and raised a considerable height. It also suggested the possible existence of an earlier low basement area in this part of the house.

Drawing room and best parlour
Further evidence for the division of these two rooms was provided by the remains of a timber slot in the floor, which most probably formed part of a larger wooden partition between the two rooms. As well as surface finds dating to the early 20th and 19th centuries directly below the floorboards, dateable finds recovered from the underlying demolition deposit included a complete hand blown green glass onion shaped wine bottle, which can be dated to between 1660 and 1700. Other pottery and clay tobacco pipe fragments recovered, also suggested that the demolition deposit, covering both the exposed cobbled floor and the compacted earth floor, dates to the late 17th century, which further implies that the newly exposed floors themselves are earlier in date, perhaps late 16th century.

Sir Thomas Stepney’s study

The complete removal of the floor-boarding in Sir Thomas Stepney's Study revealed that there was in fact two parallel north to south aligned cross walls, partitioned by a further east to west cross wall. Each of the tops of the walls was surmounted by wooden planks, which were themselves supporting the existing oak floor joists. At the far southern end of this room further excavation revealed that the short partition wall, which divided the two stone cross walls, was in fact the remains of a low basement area, which appeared to have been retained when the floor level had been raised in this room. Former access to this low basement or storage room appears to have been gained through an opening at the far south-western corner of the room via a flight of stone steps also exposed during excavations.

The results from the excavation work in this room along with further investigation and recording of the standing fabric have shown that the cobbled floor exposed in this room is almost certainly Tudor in date. How early in the Tudor period this is however, is still speculative. However, an indication, has been provided by the fact that the internal west wall of the room, which is aligned at a slight diagonal to the rest of the walls in the house, appears to have been built directly on top of this exposed cobbled floor, which suggests that this diagonal wall is later in date to the cobbled surface in this room, and as such, this further suggests the possibility that the exposed cobbled floor may have been part of an external courtyard area in the Tudor period. Potential dating for the foundations of this slanting cross wall may have been provided by the recovery of a large fragment of medieval glazed pottery in the form of a jug handle, found below a compacted clay floor in the Great Hall during recent excavations, which has a date range of between 14th and 16th centuries.

Further investigations undertaken on the exposed standing fabric, following excavations in Sir Thomas Stepney's Study, have revealed that the east to west wall and the east wall of this room and very likely the eastern building as a whole, now occupied by the West Credit Union, post-date the cobbled surface and the slanted internal west wall, and given the recovered late-17th-century material from the overlying demolition deposit in this room, it would seem likely that this part of the house was most probably constructed in the early 17th century, perhaps post 1606/7, the time of the Great Flood, but certainly before the Civil War in 1642.

The Great Hall
The room known as the Great Hall, which formerly occupied the north-western part of the ground floor, has suffered inexorably over the years, especially from the insertion of shop-fronts in the mid- to late 19th century, which unfortunately destroyed all of the north and west facing elevations at ground level and also removed much of the former timbered floor having been destroyed and replaced by concrete in the 20th century.

Following the removal of the concrete floor, excavations in the Great Hall for the insertion of a proposed new floor exposed the surface of the 17th-century floor, lying approximately 0.40 metres (1'4") below the present floor level. Loose material covering the full extent of this floor surface was removed, which exposed a compacted earth floor, which very likely would have once been covered in stone flagstones. Fortunately, the partial lower remains of the former 17th-century fireplace surround became exposed during these excavations, against the west wall along with the footprint of the former 17th-century fireplace opening and the remains of the hearth. These features are still preserved beneath the new floor in this room. Removal of the loose deposit overlying this 17th-century floor also revealed the lower section of two blocked in openings, one in the southwest corner of the room in the southern wall and another adjacent to this in the west wall alongside the former fireplace, the latter indicative of a possible doorway either leading to a former building to the west, now absent, or else a doorway to the outside. Another interpretation for this apparent opening may be that it is a blocked in alcove alongside the 17th-century fireplace. Because of the number of possibilities for this blocked in opening, this feature needs further investigation undertaken in the future in the form of excavation on the outside of the building to shed some light on its character.

Also exposed in this room were the positions of two of the 17th-century windows in the north wall and a narrow strip of cobbled floor at the far east end of the room, suggestive of a former hall passage. At the foot of the exposed standing fabric of the north wall at the head of this apparent passageway, the excavations in this room revealed the position of the former 18th-century central doorway opening, but the threshold to this doorway was positioned somewhat higher than cobbled surface, which further suggested that the cobbled passageway pre-dated the insertion of the central doorway to the house in the early 18th century. Finds recovered from the overburden covering the 17th-century floor included a large amount of 17th-century decorative plasterwork, including fragments of cornice, architrave and fireplace surround detailing.

In order to accommodate a concrete support base for the proposed display cabinet that is to hold the Stepney armorial dinner service, a large trench had to be excavated in the centre of the room, which offered archaeology the opportunity to evaluate the floor deposits below the 17th-century floor level more thoroughly than was possible for the already re-opened trial pit in this room. Excavations for this trench revealed that approximately 0.35 metres (14") below the 17th-century floor was an earlier floor level of compacted orange/buff coloured clay. This surface had been covered over with a loose demolition deposit of soil/sand, lime mortar and wall plaster, which in turn had been compacted with earth. Initially it was thought that this compacted clay floor was the natural clay, however a small trial pit was sunk through this deposit, which showed that the compacted clay floor was approximately 0.10 metres (4") thick and was covering a dark soil intermixed with irregular shaped stones. Luckily, positioning of the small trial pit happened to be positioned directly over a small post-hole, approximately 0.20 metres (8") in diameter and 0.30 metres (1') deep, filled with the same loose dark soil material. Providence also allowed the recovery of a large fragment of medieval glazed pottery in the form of a jug handle from this underlying deposit, with a date range of between the 14th and 16th centuries.

Servants' hall and cellar
In the 18th century this room was formerly a central service hall that gave access to most parts of the house, including a flight of service stairs leading to the first and second floors, Sir Thomas Stepney's Study, a low basement or cellar and access to the far eastern building now occupied by the West Credit Union. As such this room was, in the 18th century, a busy thoroughfare. In the mid- to late 19th century however, when the wine merchants the Margrave Brothers occupied the former Sir Thomas Stepney's Study, as an office, they inserted a red brick cellar below the hall with a number of brick built bays with vaulted ceilings to display and store a selection of their quality wines. However, the 19th-century ground-work for the insertion of this Victorian cellar happened to puncture through the floor of an existing 18th-century low basement room and as a consequence also excavated down to the alluvial gravels, which has had fairly dire consequences over the years with problems of flooding and slight subsidence.

In the late 20th century, the ceiling of the cellar, on its upper side in the Service Hall, was covered in its entirety in steel mesh and concrete to act as further support for the vaulted ceiling and a supporting floor for the room itself. A problem that arose from the insertion of this concrete floor however, was the fact that it had raised the floor in this room above the rest of the house ground floor level by several inches, an issue that needed to be addressed by removing all of the concrete.

Excavations in this room, for the insertion of a proposed disabled lift shaft, had already revealed that behind the Victorian red brick cellar was the earlier basement or cellar, which had had its original floor level removed and extended in the Victorian period to accommodate the new cellar design. Prior to this work however, the earlier 18th-century and early-19th-century basement appears to have been a low basement approximately 1.3 metres (4') in depth. In the early 17th century however, it is very likely that this basement area would have been absent, but the floor space itself would have acted as a thoroughfare, allowing access to the main house via small flights of wooden stairs.

Further building work in this room has revealed evidence to corroborate the idea that Llanelly House was once linked to the building to the east of the main house, which is occupied by the West Credit Union. Evidence for this emerged following the removal of a stone built block-in wall from the far northeast end of this room, which exposed a skewed cross passage leading to the building next door, remnants of 17th-century plasterwork, including the remains of a section of cornice and the outline for the position of a former wooden staircase that linked the two buildings floor levels. From the removal of this blocking in, a large fragment of decorative Elizabethan architectural stone fabric was recovered, decorated by a ‘daisy wheel’ motif interspersed with poppy heads. This fragment has been interpreted as possibly part of one of the shoulders of a former fireplace surround, perhaps from the Great Hall.

Breakfast parlour
In the 19th century this building range appears to have been used as the Llanelly House Kitchens. However, in the 18th century archaeological investigations from other parts of the house have revealed that it is possible that an earlier kitchen range existed to the east of the main house and may have occupied the building now occupied by the West Credit Union. As such it is very likely that this east wing was used as the Breakfast Parlour. However, given the character and form of this building, in the 17th century this range may well have been a stable block.

Archaeologically, very little groundwork has taken place in this room other than a series of small trial trenches undertaken prior to the insertion of new services. These trenches revealed that approximately 0.40 metres (1'4") below the existing stone flagged floor was a well-preserved cobbled floor. One of these trenches also exposed the remains of a rectangular post-hole contemporary with the cobbled floor that reached a depth of approximately 0.60 metres (2') below the cobbles.

The stair hall

This open room occupies the central core of the house and is characterised by the tall Georgian window that reaches to the ceiling at the top of the house and lights the main staircase that allows access to the first and second floors. As with the other rooms in the house, groundwork in this room was confined to the reduction of floor levels for new floor supports and services. This work revealed a continuation of the 17th-century cobbled floor already exposed in the Great Hall, with evidence of a small room, possible a storage room and an access corridor that appears to have been gained from a flight of wooden stairs from the Service Hall. Another feature exposed during ground-works was a short length of wall with an internal plastered face, which appears to have been used at a later date in the late 17th and early 18th centuries as a support wall for the main staircase.

An interesting Victorian feature in this room became exposed when plasterwork was removed from the north facing elevation below the tall window. This work revealed an apparent continuation of the same tall window to ground level. However, closer inspection of the standing fabric and the carpentry work of the hidden window frame have confirmed that the former Georgian window sill appears to have been removed at some time and the existing window frame extended to ground level. The scarred walling that remained from this work happened to have been in-filled with red brick and stone. This repair with red brick suggests that this work occurred in the early to mid-19th century and sheds some light on the appearance of the Stair Hall window at this time. A few shards of orange stained glass were also recovered from the in-fill, suggesting the presence of a former stained glass window. Closer inspection of the later blocking in of this extension suggests that the blocking in of this window extension occurred at some time in the 20th century. Work is still on going in this room and more evidence will come to light as work progresses.

Summary interpretation of results
So far, the archaeological results at Llanelly House have not only been extremely exciting, having revealed much of the form and character of the 17th-century house and potentially parts of the 16th-century and even Tudor house, but the appearance of and good preservation of the 17th-century floor surfaces, particularly the extent of cobbled surfaces, have also been very unexpected.

In general, the archaeological results at the present time appear to marry very well with the available historical documents about the house, its occupants and events from the 16th century through to the present day. Excavations have revealed that the north-western part of the ground floor, possibly the former Great Hall is the oldest part of the house, with parts of the underlying foundations and the far eastern slanted wall being 15th – 16th century in date and its earliest foundations may well have associations with the dissolution of the lesser monastery of St. Elli. This medieval building would probably have started life out as a two-storey, two-unit, end chimney gabled house, possibly with a byre building or extension attached to the west.

A southern range was added (Drawing Room and Best Parlour) along with a series of out buildings (the later Kitchen range).

In the early 17th century, perhaps as a result of damage from the Great Flood of 1606/07, as well as the marriage of Anne Lewis to Walter Vaughan of Golden Grove, an eastern range of buildings (former Sir Thomas Stepney's Study and the present West Credit Union building) was added to the old house, thus creating one long L-shaped three-storey building with a gabled roof, possibly with dormer windows in the roof space.

In the late 17th century, at some time between 1660 and 1680 the floor level appears to have been raised across the whole house, thus forming one complete level ground floor with the creation of a common or service hall with a low basement area and potentially the creation of the stair hall. In response to this work, the ceiling heights also appear to have been raised some 0.40–0.50 metres (1'4" to 1'8") on the ground floor. The interior walls of the house at this time would have all been plastered with no wooden wall panelling. The earliest oak wall panelling was most probably added in the early to mid-18th century, with pine panelling added later.

In the early years of the 18th century, post 1705, Margaret Vaughan inherited Llanelly House from one of her elder sisters on her death in 1706/7. In 1691 Margaret had already married Sir Thomas Stepney (5th Baronet), thus the Stepney lineage at the house had begun. Thomas Stepney was most likely responsible for the commissioning of the new house's front façade with its present third floor with hipped roof in a Queen Anne style, work that probably was not fully completed until 1714, as is evident from a date on one of the surviving lead drainage hoppers.

Future of the house
The house was set to reopen in 2013 as a Genealogy Heritage Centre.

The 'Be a Face' of Llanelly House campaign is encouraging people to put forward who they want to appear in the House. Project director Craig Hatto commented: "Llanelly House is the heartbeat of Llanelli and reflects the triumphs and tribulations of the town, embracing the industrial revolution and sparking prosperity."

References

External links
 Llanelly House Genealogy Heritage Centre
 Llanelli Town Council
 Llanelly House Twitter feed

Houses completed in 1714
Buildings and structures in Llanelli
Stepney family
Grade I listed buildings in Carmarthenshire
1714 establishments in Wales